Vénus (Q187) was a  of the French Navy, commissioned in 1936, and scuttled at Toulon in November 1942.

Service history
The submarine was laid down on 27 June 1932 at the Chantiers Worms shipyard at Rouen, launched on 6 April 1935, and commissioned on 15 November 1936 into the 5e Escadrille de Sous-Marins (5th Submarine Squadron), and served in the 15ème Division de Sous-Marins (15th Submarine Division) at Toulon from 1937.

On 10 January 1940, during World War II, she left Toulon for Oran, and patrolled the French West Indies, returning to France on 3 June 1940. After France surrendered to Germany in June 1940, Vénus served with the navy of Vichy France. By February 1941 she was part of a group of submarines based at Casablanca, French Morocco, and from July 1941 to February 1942 was at Dakar, Senegal. She then returned to Toulon.

The other submarines escaped, but Vénus was scuttled in the entrance of Toulon Harbour.

The wreck was salvaged in 1951 and scrapped.

See also 
List of submarines of France

References

 

1935 ships
Ships built in France
World War II submarines of France
World War II warships scuttled at Toulon
Maritime incidents in November 1942